

From 60,000 to 69,999 

 
 
 
 
 
 
 
 
 
 
 
 60558 Echeclus
 
 
 
 
 
 
 
 
 
 
 
 
 
 
 
 
 
 
 
 
 
 
 
 
 
 
 
 
 
 
 
 
 
 63305 Bobkepple
 
 
 
 
 
 
 
 
 
 
 
 
 
 
 
 
 
 
 
 
 
 
 
 
 
 
 
 
 
 
 65489 Ceto
 
 
 
 
 
 
 
 
 
 
 
 
 
 
 
 
 
 
 
 
 
 
 65803 Didymos
 
 
 
 
 
 
 
 
 66391 Moshup
 
 
 
 
 66652 Borasisi
 
 
 
 
 
 
 
 
 
 
 
 
 
 
 
 
 
 
 
 
 68109 Naomipasachoff
 
 
 
 
 
 
 
 
 
 
 
 
 
 
 
 69230 Hermes

See also 
 List of minor planet discoverers
 List of observatory codes

References

External links 
 Discovery Circumstances: Numbered Minor Planets, Minor Planet Center

Lists of minor planets by name